Anna Kameníková (born 21 March 1994) is a Czech actress. She was nominated in the category of Best Supporting Actress at the 2011 Czech Lion Awards, for her performance in the film Innocence.

She has also had roles in television series including Případy 1. oddělení, Život je ples, and miniseries Božena about the life of the Czech author Božena Němcová.

She is the daughter of the Czech actress Jitka Asterová. She got married at the age of 23 in June 2017.
Apart from being an actress, she works as a cheese store shop assistant. She has also written and published a cookbook.

References

External links

1994 births
Living people
Actresses from Prague
Czech television actresses
Czech film actresses
21st-century Czech actresses